Ghulami is a 1985 Indian Hindi-language action drama film directed by J. P. Dutta (in his directorial debut). The film has an ensemble cast comprising Dharmendra, Mithun Chakraborty, Mazhar Khan, Kulbhushan Kharbanda, Raza Murad, Reena Roy, Smita Patil, Anita Raj, Naseeruddin Shah and Om Shivpuri. Lyrics were by Gulzar and music by Laxmikant–Pyarelal, the latter of whom would go on to collaborate with Dutta in all his films until Kshatriya (1993). It was shot at Fatehpur, Rajasthan. Amitabh Bachchan narrated the film.

Plot
The film focuses on the caste and feudal system in Rajasthan. Ranjit Singh Chaudhary (Dharmendra) is the son of a peasant, living in a village which is dominated by a rich landlord Thakur family. As a teenager studying in the village school, Ranjit is rebellious and defiant against deep rooted caste prejudices and discriminatory practices. He is bullied by the two sons of the landlord, who are of his own age. Two girls who also study in the same school are sympathetic to Ranjit. These are the daughter of the school-master and the daughter of the rich landlord (sister of the bullies). Sick of the exploitation he sees around him, Ranjit runs away to the city.

Several years later, Ranjit's father dies and a telegram summons Ranjit back to the village to perform the last rites. Ranjit returns, to find that nothing has changed in the village. He is also told that his father had taken loans from the landlord to pay for his medicines and healthcare, and that Ranjit now is required to repay those loans, or forfeit his lands and house, which was the collateral for the loan. Ranjit feels that this is a great injustice. His logic of reasoning is that the peasants have been tilling the land and working hard for many generations, that the landlord only owns the land and does no work, and therefore if the landlord has lent money to a peasant, the loan does not need to be paid back. A long and emotional monologue delineates this logic for the benefit of the viewers.

The circumstances clearly call for class war and revolution, which Ranjit duly proceeds to ignite. He begins by storming into the landlord's living room, accusing him and his ancestors of being blood-suckers, and challenging him to take possession of the mortgaged land if he dares. The landlord's daughter (Smita Patil), who listens from behind a door, is deeply impressed by the scene created by her old schoolmate. Ranjit then retires to his house to perform his father's funeral, and bonds with his other friend, Moran (Reena Roy). The stage is set for a love triangle and for a revolutionary vendetta.

The love-triangle is however resolved very quickly. The landlord's sons (Bharat Kapoor and Mazhar Khan) make an attempt to rape Moran (Reena Roy). She is rescued by Ranjit, who then marries her because she clearly needs a protector. The disappointed Sumitra (Smita Patil) then agrees to marry the police officer chosen by her father, the landlord. She however carried her unrequited love in her heart, and her husband soon discovers that she had been in love with this other man. He is incensed and joins hands with his two evil brothers-in-law in their bid to finish Ranjit. By this time, after a random gunfight or two, once over the fact that the landlord's men were collecting their share of the harvest from the village peasants, Ranjit had become a fugitive from the law. Therefore, it is possible for the police office to go after him, beat him up in jail, and so on.

The rest of the movie comprises general bloodletting. Ranjit is supported in his vendetta by Javar (Mithun Chakraborty), a villager who has returned home after serving in the army, and by Gopi Dada (Kulbhushan Kharbanda), the village police havaldar, whose son had been murdered by the landlord's henchmen for daring to ride a horse on his wedding-day despite being from a lower caste. The film ends with the slaughter of most of the protagonists on both sides. The violent climax underscores the harsh reality that the rebels always die, the cruel and unjust system does not.

Cast

 Dharmendra as Ranjit Singh Choudhary
 Mithun Chakraborty as Javar Pratap
 Naseeruddin Shah as Thakur Sultan Singh
 Reena Roy as Moran Singh Choudhary
 Smita Patil as Sumitra 
 Anita Raj as Tulsi
 Kulbhushan Kharbanda as Havaldar Gopi Dada
 Raza Murad as Fatehpur's Thanedar
 Om Shivpuri as Bade Thakur
 Avtar Gill as Shaamu
 Bharat Kapoor as Thakur Shakti Singh
 Mazhar Khan as Thakur Jaswant Singh
 Sulochana Latkar as Makhan Singh's wife
 Ram Mohan as Masterji
 Anjan Srivastav as Bade Thakur's Munim
 Surendra Pal as Daku Suraj Bhan
 Rajan Haksar as Makhan Singh Choudhary
 Huma Khan as Singer

Soundtrack
The music was composed by Laxmikant–Pyarelal.

Box office
The film was a super hit and 8th highest-grossing movie of 1985.

Awards 

 33rd Filmfare Awards:

Nominated

 Best Film – Nadiadwala & Sons
 Best Supporting Actor – Kulbhushan Kharbanda

References

http://ibosnetwork.com/asp/filmbodetails.asp?id=Ghulami

External links

1985 films
1980s Hindi-language films
Films set in Rajasthan
Films scored by Laxmikant–Pyarelal
Films shot in Rajasthan
Films directed by J. P. Dutta
Films about landlords
1985 directorial debut films
Films about social issues in India
Indian action drama films
1980s action drama films